Pascal Quignard (born 23 April 1948) is a French writer born in Verneuil-sur-Avre, Eure. In 2002 his novel Les Ombres errantes won the Prix Goncourt,  France's top literary prize. Terrasse à Rome (Terrasse in Rome), received the French Academy prize in 2000. In 1980 Carus had been awarded the "Prix des Critiques".

Among Quignard's most commented-upon works are his eighty-four "Little Treatises", first published in 1991 by Maeght. But his most popular book is probably Tous les matins du monde (All the Mornings in the World), about 17th-century viola de gamba player Marin Marais and his teacher, Sainte-Colombe, which was adapted for the screen in 1991, by director Alain Corneau. Quignard wrote the screenplay of the film, in collaboration with Corneau. Tous les matins du monde, starring Jean-Pierre Marielle, Gérard Depardieu and son Guillaume Depardieu, was a tremendous success in France and sold 2 million tickets in the first year. It was subsequently distributed in 31 countries, and released in 1992 in the United States. The soundtrack was certified platinum (500,000 copies) and contributed to musician Jordi Savall’s international celebrity. 
Quignard has also translated works from the Latin (Porcius Latro), Chinese (Kong-souen Long), and Greek (Lycophron).

Books translated in English
Twelve of his books are available in English: Albucius (The Lapis Press), The Salon in Württemberg (Grove Weidenfeld), All the World's Mornings (Graywolf Press), Sarx and On Wooden Tablets: Apronenia Avitia (both Burning Deck Press), The Roving Shadows, Sex and Terror, The Silent Crossing, The Sexual Night and Abysses (all Seagull Books), The Hatred of Music (Yale University Press), and A Terrace in Rome (Wakefield Press).

Notes

External links
 Biography 
 Critical bibliography (Auteurs.contemporain.info) 
 Book of literary shadows wins Goncourt prize

1948 births
Living people
People from Eure
20th-century French novelists
21st-century French novelists
Prix Goncourt winners
Grand Prix du roman de l'Académie française winners
Prix France Culture winners
Grand prix Jean Giono recipients
French male novelists
Officiers of the Légion d'honneur
Commandeurs of the Ordre des Arts et des Lettres
20th-century French male writers
21st-century French male writers